{{DISPLAYTITLE:C8H15N}}
The molecular formula C8H15N (molar mass: 125.21 g/mol, exact mass: 125.1204 u) may refer to:

 Indolizidine
 Morphan
 Tropane

Molecular formulas